Malkhaz Asatiani (born 4 August 1981) is a Georgian former football defender. He started as an attacking midfielder but his displays at the back earned him a solid reputation as a central defender. Mostly playing as center-back at his club, Asatiani was often used as a playmaker for the national team. His passing, technical skills and eye for decisive goals made him an extremely versatile player.

Career

Club 
His club career started in Torpedo Kutaisi. During his stay of three and a half years the team won the Georgian league title three years in a row. He then earned a transfer to Russian team Lokomotiv Moscow. He plays mostly as a defender at the club and mostly as a midfielder in the national team.

On 3 December. Asatiani told the Russian newspaper, Sport-Express, that he will be leaving Lokomotiv in the end of 2010 on a free transfer. On 21 December such departure was made official.

In August 2008, Asatiani was bought on a half-year loan by Dynamo Kyiv.

National 
For the National Team, Malkhaz has played 18 international matches and scored 4 goals since his debut in 2001. One of the goals came against rivals Russia in a Euro 2004 qualifying match, something for which Asatiani received praise. He also scored important goals in the 2006 World Cup qualifying phase.

Statistics

Honours

Torpedo Kutaisi

Georgian League (3): 1999–2000, 2000–01, 2001–02
Georgian Cup (1): 2000–01

Lokomotiv Moscow

Russian League (1): 2004
Russian Cup (1): 2006–07
Russian Super Cup (2): 2003, 2005
Commonwealth of Independent States Cup (1): 2005

Dynamo Kyiv

Ukrainian League (1): 2008–09

External links

1981 births
Living people
Footballers from Georgia (country)
Expatriate footballers from Georgia (country)
Georgia (country) international footballers
FC Torpedo Kutaisi players
FC Lokomotiv Moscow players
Russian Premier League players
FC Dynamo Kyiv players
Ukrainian Premier League players
Expatriate footballers in Ukraine
Expatriate sportspeople from Georgia (country) in Ukraine
Expatriate footballers in Russia
Ukrainian people of Georgian descent
Association football defenders
People from Kutaisi